Daviesia flexuosa is a species of flowering plant in the family Fabaceae and is endemic to the south-west coast of Western Australia. It is a glabrous, spreading shrub with zig-zagged branchlets, scattered, sharply-pointed, narrowly triangular phyllodes and yellow and red flowers.

Description

Taxonomy
Daviesia flexuosa was first formally described in 1837 by George Bentham in Stephan Endlicher's Enumeratio plantarum quas in Novae Hollandiae ora austro-occidentali ad fluvium Cygnorum et in sinu Regis Georgii collegit Carolus Liber Baro de Hügel. The specific epithet (flexuosa) means "zig-zag", referring to the stem.

Distribution and habitat
This species of pea grows in open forest and heathland, near the coast of southern Western Australia between Cape Naturaliste and Mount Manypeaks..

Conservation status
Daviesia flexuosa is listed as "not threatened" by the Department of Biodiversity, Conservation and Attractions.

References

flexuosa
Flora of Western Australia
Taxa named by George Bentham
Plants described in 1837